Huesca railway station serves the city of Huesca in the province of the same name, Aragon, Spain. The station is a terminus with four platforms faces and six tracks. It was opened in 2001, replacing an earlier station that had opened in 1864 along with the Zaragoza to Huesca railway. The old station was demolished not long after the opening of the new one.

In 2016, the station was used by around 150,000 passengers.

Location
The station is located at kilometre point 88.536 on the line from Zaragoza to France via Canfranc, at 458 metres above sea level.

Infrastructure
Until 2006, the station was the only one in Spain in which trains heading towards Canfranc and the Pyrenees had to enter the station before then reversing out again to take the junction to Canfranc, around 500 metres outside the station. In 2007, Adif finished the Huesca rail bypass. Since then, regional trains from Zaragoza to Jaca and Canfranc reverse in the station.

The station has four platform faces and six tracks:
 Two tracks for high speed AVE services,  and electrified at 25 kV AC
 Four tracks for regional traffic,  and not electrified

Although the line from Huesca to Tardienta has standard gauge tracks and is electrified at 25 kV, it is not a high speed line, and trains travel along this section at conventional speeds.

References

Madrid–Barcelona high-speed rail line
Railway stations in Spain opened in 1864
Railway stations in Spain opened in 2001